"I Don't Know Anybody Else" is a song by Italian music group Black Box. It was the second single from their debut album, Dreamland (1990), and was originally released in the United States in December 1989. It was released worldwide in the early months of 1990 and had a great success in record charts, including Ireland, Switzerland, Norway and the United Kingdom, where it reached the Top 5. In other countries, it peaked between number 5 and number 10. It entered the UK Singles Chart on February 17, 1990 and remained for eight weeks.

The song features an uncredited Martha Wash on lead vocals, while Katrin Quinol lip-synches the vocals in its accompanying music video. The melody line in the intro resembles a section of "Love Sensation" by Loleatta Holloway, the original line being "Can't you see that I love nobody else".

Chart performance
"I Don't Know Anybody Else" was quite successful on the charts on several continents. In Europe, it made it to the top 10 in Austria, Finland (number two), France, Ireland (number two), Norway, Sweden, Switzerland and the United Kingdom, as well as on the Eurochart Hot 100, where it hit number five. In the UK, the single peaked at number four in its second week at the UK Singles Chart, on February 18, 1990. Additionally, it was a top 20 hit in Italy and West Germany, and a top 30 hit in the Netherlands. Outside Europe, it peaked at number-one on the Billboard Hot Dance Club Play chart in the United States and was a top 10 hit in Australia, where it peaked at number six and was awarded a gold record after 35,000 singles were sold there. In New Zealand, it went to number 25.

Critical reception
Upon the release, Larry Flick from Billboard stated that here, the "groove remains in trendy Italo-house vein with diva-styled vocals fueling the fire of tune's brain-imbedding hook." A reviewer from Cash Box wrote that the group "who surprised everyone by breaking out of clubs and onto the pop charts clocks in with its second single, driven by the same intense vocals and formidable house groove that skyrocketed its U.S. debut single, "Everybody, Everybody"." Bob Stanley from Melody Maker commented, "After Technotronic's hugely disappointing soundalike sequel, this is a far better proposition. But then it's from a far better source. And, no, the voice doesn't grate anything like as much and, as long as the public can put up with another dance record that has "touch me" as a hookline, this is a surefire Number One." Another editor, Andrew Smith, said it's "the one that lures me away from the bar time after time, with its powerfully compelling house rhythm and transcendent melody."	

Gene Sandbloom from The Network Forty felt that the song "has every bit the house power, but this time lead vocalist Katrin Quinol kicks off with an Annie Lennox intro that leaves you almost exhausted after four minutes." David Quantick  from NME said, "It ain't 'Ride on Time' sadly, although a lot of other records this year are. It is fairly OK, even if it does boast a "Sample Free Mix" (this may be a joke). Main probs; not fast enough and lacking a loud woman shouting excitingly."	Chris Heath from Smash Hits felt that it's "exceedingly similar" to "Ride on Time", and complimented it as "slightly brilliant".

Retrospective response
In 2009, the Daily Vault's Michael R. Smith described it as "effective and timeless" in his review of Dreamland, and added that it now "sound fresher and fuller of life than ever." Vibe magazine listed the song at number 11 in their list of "Before EDM: 30 Dance Tracks from The '90s That Changed the Game" in 2013. They wrote that the song "helped propel Italian house group Black Box into international fame thanks to the track’s strong vocals (exhibited by Martha Wash) fused with beats laid down by club DJ Daniele Davoli and keyboard wiz Mirko Limoni".

Music video
A music video was made for "I Don't Know Anybody Else", directed by Judith Briant. It features the group performing the song in a club. Briant also directed the video for "Ride on Time" (with Greg Copeland). "I Don't Know Anybody Else" was later published on Black Box' official YouTube channel in June 2009. The video has amassed more than 8.3 million views as of October 2022.

For the US release, the video was re-edited. Visual effects and animations were added on-screen, along with pictures from a Katrin Quinol photoshoot that was later used as the single cover.

Track listings

 US 12” single and CD maxi
 "I Don't Know Anybody Else" (we got salsoul mix) — 5:40
 "I Don't Know Anybody Else" (DJ Lelewel mix) — 6:47
 "I Don't Know Anybody Else" (a cappella) — 3:40
 "I Don't Know Anybody Else" (hurley's house mix) — 7:00
 "I Don't Know Anybody Else" (hurley's house dub) — 5:08
 "I Don't Know Anybody Else" (deephouse instrumental) — 4:30

 UK CD single
 "I Don't Know Anybody Else" (7”) - 4:15
 "I Don't Know Anybody Else" (house club/free sample mix) - 6:17
 “Ride On Time” (original mix) - 4:10

 UK 7” single
 "I Don't Know Anybody Else" (edit one) - 4:10
 "I Don't Know Anybody Else" (edit two) - 3:30

 UK first 12” maxi
 "I Don't Know Anybody Else" (melody mix/sample free mix) (w/o count-in) - 6:33
 "I Don't Know Anybody Else" (house club/free sample mix) - 6:15

 UK second 12” maxi
 "I Don't Know Anybody Else" (we got salsoul mix) — 5:40
 “Ride On Time” (massive mix) - 4:10
 "I Don't Know Anybody Else" (DJ Lelewel mix) — 6:47

 Italian 12" maxi
 "I Don't Know Anybody Else" (melody mix/sample free mix) — 6:36
 "I Don't Know Anybody Else" (house club/free sample mix) — 6:15

 Italian 7" single
 "I Don't Know Anybody Else" (LP version) — 4:30
 "I Don't Know Anybody Else" (house club edit) — 4:00

Charts

Weekly charts

Year-end charts

Certifications and sales

See also
 List of number-one dance singles of 1991 (U.S.)

References

1990 singles
1989 songs
Black Box (band) songs
English-language Italian songs
Martha Wash songs
Number-one singles in Finland
Polydor Records singles